Guttenberg Community School District (GCSD) was a school district headquartered in Guttenberg, Iowa.

It operated a K-8 School and Guttenberg High School.

History
In December 1999 the district and the Garnavillo Community School District agreed to begin whole-grade-sharing (in which students from one district attend another district's schools for a particular grade level) in 2001. The district began sharing athletic teams with Garnavillo in 2000. The whole grade-sharing began as scheduled in 2001. The districts combined their secondary schools, with the high school in Guttenberg and the middle school in Garnavillo. The two retained their respective elementary schools.

On September 14, 2004, an election on merging the two districts into one was held, with Guttenberg district voters approving it 396–19, and Garnavillo district voters approving it 188–20. The merger into the Clayton Ridge Community School District was effective July 1, 2005.

References

External links
  (guttenberg.k12.ia.us domain)
  (aea1.k12.ia.us/guttenberg/ domain) (note in earliest versions of the page, the left-hand links are white text on a white background, so highlight the text to show the links)

Defunct school districts in Iowa
Education in Clayton County, Iowa
2005 disestablishments in Iowa
School districts disestablished in 2005